Petar Nikolić (born September 25, 1993) is a Macedonian professional basketball Guard who plays for Kumanovo in the Macedonian First League.

External links

References

1993 births
Living people
KK Rabotnički players
Macedonian men's basketball players
Macedonian people of Serbian descent
Guards (basketball)